Francesco Monti may refer to:
Francesco Monti (il Brescianino) (1646–1712)
Francesco Monti (Bologna) (1683–1768)